Jane Kramer (born August 7, 1938) is an American journalist who is the European correspondent for The New Yorker; she has written a regular "Letter from Europe" for twenty years.  Kramer has also written nine books, the latest of which, Lone Patriot (2003), is about a militia in the American West. Her other books include The Last Cowboy, Europeans and The Politics of Memory.

In Last Cowboy and Lone Patriot she explored downward mobility in America.

Biography
Kramer was born in Providence, Rhode Island.  She has a B.A. in English from  Vassar College and an M.A. in English from Columbia University.

For the first paperback edition of The Last Cowboy, Kramer received a 1981 National Book Award for Nonfiction.

Her other awards include an Emmy Award for documentary filmmaking, National Magazine Award, Front Page Award, and the :fr:Prix européen de l'essai Charles Veillon.

Kramer is a fellow of the American Academy of Arts and Sciences, a member of the Council on Foreign Relations and a founding director of the Committee to Protect Journalists. She has taught at Princeton University, Sarah Lawrence, CUNY, and the University of California, Berkeley.

Since 2006, Kramer has been a Chevalier de la Légion d'Honneur.  In 2016,  she was elected to the American Academy of Arts and Letters.

Bibliography

Books

Essays and reporting
 
 
 
 
 
 
 
———————
Notes

Notes

References

External links 
 Biography at Newnewjournalism.com
 Biography at the Baruch College

American women journalists
Sarah Lawrence College faculty
National Book Award winners
The New Yorker people
The New Yorker staff writers
Vassar College alumni
Columbia Graduate School of Arts and Sciences alumni
1938 births
Living people
Lincoln School (Providence, Rhode Island) alumni
American women academics
21st-century American women
Members of the American Academy of Arts and Letters